The House of Moray or Clann Ruaidrí is a historiographical and genealogical construct to illustrate the succession of rulers whose base was in Moray and who ruled sometimes a larger kingdom. An important feature of Scottish politics throughout the 11th century, they reached the height of their power with the reign of Macbeth between 1040 and 1057.

Clann Ruaidrí first appears in the documentary record in 1020 with the killing of Findláech mac Ruaidrí by his nephews, the sons of Máel Brigte. Findláech's death is recorded in both the Annals of Tigernach, where he is described as Mormaer of Moray, and the Annals of Ulster, where he is described as King of Alba.

Clann Ruaidri has been claimed to have been descended in the male line from the Cenél Loairn, one of the ruling kindreds of Gaelic Dál Riata, based on a genealogy of Máel Snechtai reproduced in four Irish manuscripts. This genealogy has now been shown to be a clear and chronologically impossible fabrication made in the 11th or 12th centuries, constructed by joining three existing genealogies together. The pedigree lists only one further name beyond the ancestors of Máel Snechtai already identifiable from annalistic sources - that of Domnall, the father of Ruaidrí, who was the father of Findláech of Moray. The immediate ancestor of Domnall is given as Mongán mac Domnaill, who in fact died , over three centuries before the death of Findláech in 1020.

At the times when the rival house held the throne, the Moray leaders usually had their effectively independent state of Moray, where a succession of kings (kinglets) or mormaers ruled.

The succession followed quite loyally the rules of tanistry, resulting in practice to outcomes where branches of the leaders' extended family rotated on the rulership, possibly keeping a balance between important branches. This is quite typical for tribal societies, where primogeniture is much less usual than agnatic seniority or turns on the throne. For example, Macbeth, King of Scotland descended from one branch, and his stepson Lulach from another.

Genealogy and recorded titles

See also
 Scotland in the Early Middle Ages
 Scotland in the High Middle Ages
 Scottish monarchs family tree
 Style of the monarchs of Scotland

References

Bibliography
 
 
 
 
 

 
Scottish royalty
Lists of Scottish people
Medieval Scottish families